Joel John is an American politician and former member of the Arizona House of Representatives. A member of the Arizona Republican Party, he served alongside Democrat Brian Fernandez in Arizona's 4th legislative district.

Career 
John was born and raised in Buckeye, Arizona. He comes from a family of farmers who have been in Arizona since the late 1800s, and in the Buckeye region since the 1950s. Before his legislative career, John was a music teacher at Buckeye Elementary School. As a first-time candidate in 2020, John won his seat after placing second in the district's general election, thereby defeating Democratic incumbent Geraldine Peten.

References

Living people
Republican Party members of the Arizona House of Representatives
21st-century American politicians
Year of birth missing (living people)
People from Buckeye, Arizona